Hello Dracula is a 2020 South Korean television series starring Seohyun, Lee Ji-hyun, Lee Joo-bin, Go Na-hee and Seo Eun-yool. Part of the omnibus project Drama Festa, it aired on JTBC on February 17–18, 2020.

Synopsis
Three stories of people trying to overcome their own problems, their draculas.

Cast

Main
 Seohyun as An-na
An elementary school teacher who usually hides her emotions from her mother since the day she came out to her as a lesbian. She suffers from depression and has recently parted ways with her girlfriend of 8 years.
 Lee Ji-hyun as Mi-young
A famous television series writer and An-na's mother who uses her daughter's name as a pen name. She cares for An-na in her own way, unaware that the latter feels suffocated.
 Lee Joo-bin as Seo-yeon
Lead singer of the band Ashes, she also gives music classes at the same elementary school where An-na teaches since her career as a musician does not pay much. She struggles between realizing her dreams and living her reality.
 Go Na-hee as Yu-ra
One of An-na's students, she comes from a poor family and is often called a beggar by bullies. Because of a redevelopment project, her family is forced to move out and she has to change schools.
 Seo Eun-yool as Ji-hyung
Yu-ra's friend. His reality is entirely different from hers as his father is a university professor. His mother is unhappy with his friendship with Yu-ra because of the social class she belongs to.

Supporting
 Oh Man-seok as Jong-su
A dentist who also gives life lessons to Mi-young, Seo-yeon, Yu-ra and Ji-hyung.
 Ji Il-joo as Sang-gu
Seo-yeon's ex-boyfriend who left her a year ago. He was cheating on her.
 Lee Chung-ah as So-jung
An-na's ex-girlfriend. She decided to break up due to social and family pressure.
 Moon Ji-hoo as Choi Seon-saeng
A teacher at an elementary school. He is friends with Anna and has good feelings for her.

Original soundtrack

Ratings

References

External links
  
 
 

JTBC television dramas
Korean-language television shows
2020 South Korean television series debuts
2020 South Korean television series endings
South Korean LGBT-related television shows
2020s LGBT-related drama television series
Lesbian-related television shows